The Crichton Medal is the name given to the best and fairest award for the Australian rules football team the Essendon Football Club. The naming of the award is in honour of Wally Crichton, a former administrator for Essendon (who was a committeeman from 1926 to 1931, vice-president from 1932 to 1940, and president from 1941 to 1959). The voting system as of the 2017 AFL season consists of five coaches, giving each player a ranking from zero to five after each match. Players can receive a maximum of 25 votes for a game.

Essendon's best-and-fairest award has been awarded since 1897, although records of winners between 1897 and 1921 are incomplete. The award was suspended during World War I.

Recipients

Multiple winners

Notes
 The best-and-fairest was first awarded in 1897; however, records from 1897 to 1921 are incomplete.
 The Essendon Football Club did not participate in the 1916 and 1917 VFL seasons due to World War I.

References
General

Specific

Australian Football League awards
Essendon Football Club
Awards established in 1897
Australian rules football-related lists
1897 establishments in Australia